Daniel David John Adams-Ray (born 18 August 1983 in Nairobi, Kenya) is a  Kenyan-Swedish singer and fashion designer.

Background
Daniel Adams-Ray was born in Kenya to an Indonesian mother and a father of Swedish/Scottish heritage. His mother was a school administrator and his father a medical surgeon. In 1996 the family left Africa for Europe and lived for a year in the Netherlands, where he played football (soccer) with a very young Arjen Robben. Later the family left to Sweden, where they lived in Lidingö, an affluent suburb of Stockholm. His parents owned and operated a plastic-surgery clinic in the area. Daniel Adams-Ray says he felt very much like an outsider and says he was bullied and called racist slurs. After switching high schools, he started at Viktor Rydberg Gymnasium Odenplan and met Oskar Linnros, his future partner in the band Snook.

He is fluent in English, French, Dutch, German and Swedish. He also speaks quite a bit of Italian and Swahili.

He is related to Swedish journalist Kersti Adams-Ray.

Snook

The schoolmates and Oskar Linnros started an alternative hip hop duo group calling it Snook. The duo released two albums: Vi vet inte vart vi ska men vi ska komma dit in 2004 and Är in 2006 receiving both praise and heavy criticism. The band's unorthodox hip hop was met by comments that the band wasn't "keeping it real" and the fact that Adams-Ray spent his teenage years in Lidingö caused critics to label them "upper class rappers". Despite some critics, the band had many hits, received awards from radio station P3, The 2003 Swedish Hip-hop Awards 2003, and best Swedish band at the MTV Europe Music Awards 2006. Daniel Adams-Ray won the Swedish freestyle-rap championship in 2004 and was awarded the prize for best Swedish rapper in 2005.

Post-Snook
Adams-Ray and Oskar Linnros drifted apart. Adams-Ray attended the design school Berghs School of Communication and started the fashion label Lagom. During a fashion show in 2009 he produced some music and this led to new songs (with him singing, not rapping). He says his music might be called Kenyan pop-disco-indie-punk. Influenced range from Motown-disco, afro beat, hip-hop and early 60's surf pop.

Recently he has also collaborated with fellow swede Avicii in a new song Somewhere in Stockholm, which belong to his album Stories. 3 years later, he collaborated with Avicii again on a song titled "Ghost". For this single, Adams-Ray is credited under the name HUMAN.

Discography

Studio albums

Singles

Featured singles

Other charted songs

Notes

References

External links
http://www.lagom-sthlm.com/

Living people
1983 births
21st-century Swedish singers
Swedish hip hop musicians
Swedish pop singers
Swedish songwriters
Swedish-language singers
English-language singers from Sweden
Swedish people of Kenyan descent
Swedish people of Scottish descent
Swedish people of Indonesian descent
Musicians from Stockholm
Singers from Stockholm
21st-century Swedish male singers